Christof Lindenmayer is an American former professional soccer player who competed for the Columbus Crew (MLS) as well as the Hershey Wildcats (A-League) and the Virginia Beach Mariners (A-League) before retiring due to chronic hamstring injuries.  Lindenmayer also starred for the Loyola College (MD) men's soccer team from 1996 to 1999, where he was a two-time MAAC Player of the Year as well as being named to the NSCAA All-Region South Atlantic team in both 1998 and 1999.

References 

1977 births
Living people
American soccer players
American soccer coaches
Loyola Greyhounds men's soccer players
Columbus Crew players
MLS Pro-40 players
Hershey Wildcats players
Cincinnati Riverhawks players
Virginia Beach Mariners players
Soccer players from Ohio
A-League (1995–2004) players
Columbus Crew draft picks
Association football forwards